Paul David Dyer (born 24 January 1953) is an English former professional footballer who played as a midfielder for football league clubs Notts County and Colchester United, where he made over 100 appearances. He describes himself as a "bite and scratch midfield player". Dyer also played non-league football for Gravesend & Northfleet and Chelmsford City. Dyer is currently working as a taxi driver in Colchester, having previously worked as a volunteer at Colchester United, painting the roof, driving the minibus and sweeping the dressing rooms.

References

External links
 
 Paul Dyer at Colchester United Archive Database

1953 births
English footballers
Footballers from Leicester
Notts County F.C. players
Colchester United F.C. players
Ebbsfleet United F.C. players
Chelmsford City F.C. players
Living people
Association football midfielders
British taxi drivers